The White Stallion Ranch, in Pima County, Arizona near Tucson, is a historic guest ranch. It is one of only two surviving dude ranches of the Tucson area, where there once were 20 or so.

It was founded in 1900 as squatter's cattle ranch.  Legal ownership was established via homesteading in 1936, and it was opened as a guest ranch, also known as a dude ranch, in the early 1940s, when it was known as the CB Bar Ranch.  Six buildings where guests could stay were built after the property was acquired by Max Zimmerman in 1945, and it became the MZ Bar Ranch. Or it was bought in 1940 by "Chicago liquor store owner Max Zimmerman", who had moved to the area "to become part of the once vibrant guest ranching industry in Tucson."

Its  property adjoins the Saguaro National Park's western unit, the Tucson Mountain District, to the south.  The MZ Bar Ranch grew a reputation in the film industry, and its vicinity was a filming location for numerous westerns, including The Last Round-Up (1947), Relentless (1948), The Gal Who Took the West (1949), and Winchester 73 (1950).

It is a member of the Historic Hotels of America (HHA), a program of the National Trust for Historic Preservation, and was an HHA "Awards of Excellence" winner in 2016.

See also
Hacienda Del Sol Guest Ranch Resort, Tucson, Arizona.  The other surviving dude ranch, apparently, and also an HHA member.

References

External links
White Stallion Ranch, official site

Historic Hotels of America
Pima County, Arizona
Hotels in Arizona
Dude ranches